Heredia is a canton in the Heredia province of Costa Rica. The head city is in Heredia district, and is also the provincial capital of Heredia Province.

History 
Heredia was created on 7 December 1848 by decree 167.

Geography 
Heredia has an area of  km² and a mean elevation of  metres.

The canton includes the areas south and west of the capital city of Heredia as far as the Virilla River and the National Route 1. 

The non-contiguous district of Varablanca, that includes a large portion of Braulio Carrillo National Park high in the Cordillera Central, is also administered as part of Heredia Canton.

Districts 
The canton of Heredia is subdivided into the following districts:
 Heredia
 Mercedes
 San Francisco
 Ulloa
 Varablanca

Demographics 

For the 2011 census, Heredia had a population of  inhabitants.

Transportation

Road transportation 
The canton is covered by the following road routes:

Rail transportation 
The Interurbano Line operated by Incofer goes through this canton.

References 

Cantons of Heredia Province
Populated places in Heredia Province